Muzyka Rozrywkowa is the first solo album by Polish rapper Pezet, a member of Płomień 81.

Track list

Polish-language albums
2007 albums